Clevenger is a surname. Notable people with the surname include:

Claudia Clevenger (born 1955), American former competition swimmer and world record-holder
Cliff Clevenger (1885–1960), United States Representative from Ohio
Craig Clevenger, American author of contemporary fiction
Dale Clevenger (1940–2022), principal horn of the Chicago Symphony Orchestra
Ean Elliot Clevenger, multi-instrumentalist, vocalist, and songwriter for A-F Record's political hardcore-punk band Pipedown
Helen Clevenger (died 1936), American college student murdered in Asheville, North Carolina
Raymond C. Clevenger (born 1937), American federal judge
Raymond F. Clevenger (1926–2016), U.S. Representative from the U.S. state of Michigan
Shobal Vail Clevenger (1812–1843), United States sculptor
Shobal Vail Clevenger Jr. (1843–1920), American physician who specialized in nervous and mental diseases
Steve Clevenger (born 1986), Major League Baseball catcher
Sylvia Clevenger (1891–1951), American prostitute, minor associate of the John Dillinger gang
Tex Clevenger (1932–2019), Major League Baseball relief pitcher/spot starter
Vern Clevenger (born 1955), climber and landscape photographer
Zora G. Clevenger (1881–1970), American football, basketball, and baseball player, coach, and athletic director

See also
Clevenger, Missouri, unincorporated community in Clay County, in the U.S. state of Missouri
Cleven
Clevinger (disambiguation)